Goovaerts is a Dutch surname. Notable people with this surname include:

 Agustín Goovaerts, Belgian architect and engineer
 Henri Goovaerts (1865–1912), Dutch painter
 Renée Goovaerts, wife of Alberto Cortez (1940-2019), Argentinian singer and songwriter

Dutch-language surnames